The 1980–81 Wake Forest Demon Deacons men's basketball team represented Wake Forest University during the 1980–81 NCAA men's basketball season.

Personnel
Scott Davis
Frank Johnson
Jim Johnstone
Guy Morgan
Alvis Rogers
Assistant coaches: Rich Knarr, Ernie Nestor

References

Wake Forest Demon Deacons men's basketball seasons
Wake Forest
Wake Forest